Huli jing are Chinese mythological creatures usually capable of shapeshifting, who may either be benevolent or malevolent spirits. In Chinese mythology and folklore, the fox spirit takes variant forms with different meanings, powers, characteristics, and shapes, including huxian, hushen, husheng, huwang, huyao, and jiuweihu.

Fox spirits and nine-tailed foxes appear frequently in Chinese folklore, literature, and mythology. Depending on the story, the fox spirit's presence may be a good or a bad omen. The motif of nine-tailed foxes from Chinese culture was eventually transmitted and introduced to Japanese and Korean cultures.

Descriptions

The nine-tailed fox occurs in the Shanhaijing (Classic of Mountains and Seas), compiled from the Warring States period to the Western Han period (circa fourth to circa first century BC). The work states: 

In chapter 14 of the Shanhaijing, Guo Pu, a scholar of the Eastern Jin dynasty, had commented that the "nine-tailed fox was an auspicious omen that appeared during times of peace." However, in chapter 1, another aspect of the nine-tailed fox is described: 

In one ancient myth, Yu the Great encountered a white nine-tailed fox, which he interpreted as an auspicious sign that he would marry Nüjiao. In Han iconography, the nine-tailed fox is sometimes depicted at Mount Kunlun and along with Xi Wangmu in her role as the goddess of immortality. According to the first-century Baihutong (Debates in the White Tiger Hall), the fox's nine tails symbolize abundant progeny.

During the Han dynasty (202 BC – 9 AD; 25–220 AD), the development of ideas about interspecies transformation had taken place in Chinese culture. The idea that non-human creatures with advancing age could assume human form is presented in works such as the Lunheng by Wang Chong (27–91). As these traditions developed, the fox's capacity for transformation was shaped.

Describing the transformation and other features of the fox, Guo Pu (276–324) made the following comment:

In Duìsúpiān (對俗篇) of the Baopuzi, it is written:

In a Tang Dynasty story, foxes could become humans by wearing a skull and worshipping the Big Dipper. They would try multiple skulls until they found one that fit without falling off.

The Youyang Zazu made a connection between nine-tailed foxes and the divine: 

The fox spirits encountered in tales and legends are usually females and appear as young, beautiful women. One of the most infamous fox spirits in Chinese mythology was Daji, who is portrayed in the Ming Dynasty shenmo novel Fengshen Yanyi. A beautiful daughter of a general, she was married forcibly to the cruel tyrant King Zhou of Shang. A nine-tailed fox spirit who served Nüwa, whom King Zhou had offended, entered into and possessed her body, expelling the true Daji's soul. The spirit, as Daji, and her new husband schemed cruelly and invented many devices of torture, such as forcing righteous officials to hug red-hot metal pillars. Because of such cruelties, many people, including King Zhou's own former generals, revolted and fought against the Shang dynasty. Finally, King Wen of Zhou, one of the vassals of Shang, founded a new dynasty named after his country. The fox spirit in Daji's body was later driven out by Jiang Ziya, the first Prime Minister of the Zhou dynasty, and her spirit condemned by Nüwa herself for excessive cruelty.

Traditions

Popular fox worship during the Tang dynasty has been mentioned in a text entitled Hu Shen (Fox gods): 

In the Song dynasty, fox spirit cults, such as those dedicated to Daji, became outlawed, but their suppression was unsuccessful. For example, in 1111, an imperial edict was issued for the destruction of many spirit shrines within Kaifeng, including those of Daji.

On the eve of the Jurchen invasion, a fox went to the throne of Emperor Huizong of Song. This resulted in Huizong ordering the destruction of all fox temples in Kaifeng. The city was invaded the next day, and the dynasty fell after five months.

In late imperial China, during the Ming and Qing dynasties, disruptions in the domestic environment could be attributed to the mischief of fox spirits, which could throw or tear apart objects in a manner similar to a poltergeist. "Hauntings" by foxes were often regarded as both commonplace and essentially harmless, with one seventeenth-century author commenting that "Out of every ten houses in the capital, six or seven have fox demons, but they do no harm and people are used to them".

Typically fox spirits were seen as dangerous, but some of the stories in the Qing dynasty book Liaozhai Zhiyi by Pu Songling are love stories between a fox appearing as a beautiful girl and a young human male. In the fantasy novel The Three Sui Quash the Demons' Revolt, a huli jing teaches a young girl magic, enabling her to conjure armies with her spells.

Belief in fox spirits has also been implicated as an explanatory factor in the incidence of attacks of koro, a culture-bound syndrome found in southern China and Malaysia in particular.

There is mention of the fox spirit in Chinese Chán Buddhism, when Linji Yixuan compares them to voices that speak of the Dharma, stating "the immature young monks, not understanding this, believe in these fox-spirits..."

In popular culture

Manhua 
 Fox Spirit Matchmaker (2015)

Film 
 Painted Skin (2008) and its sequel (2012)
 A Chinese Fairy Tale (2011)
 League of Gods (2016)
 Once Upon a Time (2017)
 Hanson and the Beast (2017)
 The Legend of Hei (2019)
 Jiang Ziyia (2020)
 Soul Snatcher (2020)
 Shang-Chi and the Legend of the Ten Rings (2021)

TV series 
 The Legend of Nezha  (2003)
 Strange Tales of Liao Zhai  (2005)
 The Legend and the Hero (2007) and its sequel (2009)
 The Investiture of the Gods (2014) and The Investiture of the Gods 2 (2015)
 Legend of Nine Tails Fox (2016)
 Fox in the Screen  (2016)
 Eternal Love  (2017)
 Moonshine and Valentine (2017)
 Beauties in the Closet  (2018)
 Investiture of the Gods (2019)
 Love, Death & Robots Episode 8 (2019)
 The Life of White Fox  (2019)
 Eternal Love of Dream (2020)

See also
Daji, a well-known character who was a fox spirit in the Fengshen Yanyi
Nine-tailed fox, the most well-known fox spirit in Chinese mythology
Huxian, the fox immortals, highly cultivated fox spirits in Chinese tradition
Kitsune, a similar fox spirit from Japan
Kumiho, a similar fox spirit from Korea
Hồ ly tinh, a similar fox spirit from Vietnam
Strange Stories from a Chinese Studio, a compilation of supernatural stories of which many have fox spirits as a theme

References

Literature

 
 Ting, Nai-tung. "A Comparative Study of Three Chinese and North-American Indian Folktale Types." Asian Folklore Studies 44, no. 1 (1985): 42–43. Accessed July 1, 2020. doi:10.2307/1177982.
Anatole, Alex. "Tao of Celestial Foxes -The Way to Immortality" Volumes I, II, III)(2015)

External links
Fox Spirits in Asia

Chinese legendary creatures
Yaoguai
Fairies
Inari faith
Mythological canines
Mythological foxes
Shapeshifting